Dryophilocoris is a genus of true bugs belonging to the family Miridae.

The species of this genus are found in Europe and Japan.

Species:
 Dryophilocoris alni Zou, 1986 
 Dryophilocoris flavoquadrimaculatus (De Geer, 1773)

References

Miridae